Durst is an Italian manufacturer of photographic printing equipment.

History
Established in 1936 by two brothers, Julius and Gilbert Durst, who were enthusiasts in the field of photography, encouraged by their mother, who was also a keen photographer and had her own darkroom.

Products

Durst ended production of their enlargers in late 2006 due to a drop in sales, probably due to growth of minilabs and later digital imaging. In the 70 years of manufacturing enlargers their sales peaked in 1979 with 107,000 sold. Durst have filed over 500 patents for various components and designs of enlargers.

Now, Durst produce a range of photochemical (Durst Lambda and Theta printers) and super wide format inkjet printers based on UV polymerization ink technology. The quality of the output of these products is exceptional, as was the case with the company's historical enlargers, for high quality image reproduction and high versatility of application, from paper and plastic materials to ceramics and wood.

Lambda and Theta photographic printers
The Durst Lambda and Theta models are widely used in the photographic printing industry to produce digital C-Type prints on light sensitive colour and monochrome papers and transparency display materials such as Kodak Duratrans and Duraclear. Images are produced by exposing light sensitive material with RGB laser light which is then developed through the relevant chemical process. The Theta is also capable of holding two different paper types at once.

Durst inkjet printers
Durst expanded in 2003 into UV Curable Digital Inkjet Printers with the Rho 160, and now produces a full line of Large Format, Textile, Ceramic, Label and Industrial Inkjet printers for a variety of applications. The Durst Rho 500 Roll-to-Roll Printer and the Durst Rho P10-250 Flatbed Printer have both won "Product of the Year" at the Specialty Graphics Industry Association Awards.

References

External links
 
 Official United States sales and service site
 History (PDF)
 Photographica.dk - News
 Technical Information, Metro Imaging website

Brixen
Photography companies of Italy
Italian brands